Alien Autopsy is a 2006 British comedy film with elements of science fiction directed by Jonny Campbell. Written by William Davies, it relates the events surrounding the famous "alien autopsy" film promoted by Ray Santilli and stars Ant McPartlin and Declan Donnelly, also known as Ant & Dec, as Santilli and Gary Shoefield. The film was a moderate commercial success domestically, making no. 3 on the British box office chart.

Plot
The film is framed by Ray Santilli and his friend Gary Shoefield retelling the events to a documentary maker named Morgan Banner.

In 1995, Ray and Gary go to the United States to find Elvis memorabilia to sell on the market stall Ray runs in London. A former US Army cameraman, Harvey, sells them a silent black and white film of Elvis performing live, but later returns with an intriguing offer. Harvey takes Ray to Miami, Florida to see a film from 1947, showing the autopsy of an alien supposedly killed in a UFO crash in Roswell, New Mexico. Harvey wants to sell the film for $30,000.

Gary and Ray return to England to look for an investor to give them the money. Ray convinces Laszlo Voros, a Hungarian homosexual art and drug dealer obsessed with crop circles, to give him the $30,000 and retrieves the film from Harvey. Back in England, the pair discover that the film has degraded from humidity and heat and is now completely unwatchable. In order to avoid serious repercussions from Voros, they decide to make their own recreation of it. They base the content on Ray's memories of the original, and, with the help of some friends, fashion a convincing replica of the dead alien using a mannequin and meat products obtained from a friend's butcher's shop, turn the living room of Gary's sister into a film set, and shoot the film on a Bell and Howell spring-wound camera. Ray gives a copy of the final product to Voros, who believes it to be real.

Having convinced Voros, Ray and Gary decide to sell the film to other venues, earning them a large sum of money. However, when Voros hears about its international distribution, he demands 80% of the profits. A potential clash is averted when Voros is killed by a green Land Rover while standing naked in the middle of a crop circle, leading to speculation that he has been killed by a CIA agent.

Ray and Gary travel to Argentina to promote the film, followed by reporter Amber Fuentes, who seduces Ray. She eventually tracks down Harvey, who demands from Ray and Gary that they maintain his anonymity. To fulfil this obligation, they produce an interview with a homeless former actor playing Harvey, which convinces Amber. She remains sceptical, however, about the film's authenticity.

Ray and Gary are now persuaded that some of the original 1947 footage might actually be recovered by film restoration experts in order to be viewed. However, after viewing the results, the pair bury the film, telling each other that they cannot continue with the endeavour.

Cast
 Declan Donnelly as Ray Santilli
 Anthony McPartlin as Gary Shoefield
 Bill Pullman as Morgan Banner
 Götz Otto as Laszlo Voros
 Morwenna Banks as Jasmine
 Omid Djalili as Melik
 Harry Dean Stanton as Harvey
Michael Rouse as Young Harvey
 Mike Blakeley and Matthew Blakeley as The Camera Team
 John Shrapnel as Michael Kuhn
 Madeleine Moffatt as Nan
 John Cater as Maurice
 Lee Oakes as Edgar
 Perry Benson as Trading Standards Officer
 Jimmy Carr as Gary's Manager
 Winston Thomas as Zachary
 Pam Shaw as Aunty P.
 David Threlfall as Jeffrey, Film Restorer
 Andrew Greenough as Preston
 Stephanie Metcalfe as Doreen
 Jonathan Coy as The Museum Director
 Ian Porter as Pentagon Officer
 Shane Rimmer as Colonel
 Naima Belkhiati as French TV Buyer
 Miguel Angel Plaza as Mr. Gonzalez
 Jeff Harding as CIA Agent
 Kevin Breznahan as Junior TV Executive
 Martin McDougall as Middle-Ranking TV Executive
 Lachele Carl as TV News Anchor
 Paul Birchard as Senior TV Executive
 Sam Douglas as The Network President
 Adriana Yanez as The Stewardess, Argentina
 Nichole Hiltz as Amber Fuentes
 Luis Soto as Peruvian TV Host
 Christina Piaget as The Interviewer
 Christina Souza as The Stewardess, Mexicana
 Bradley Lavelle as New York Host
 Orson Bean as Homeless Man
 Sophia Ellis as UFO Enthusiast
 Jonathan Frakes Himself

The film also contains brief appearances by Ray Santilli and Gary Shoefield.

Reception

The film received mainly positive reviews earning a 71% approval rating on Rotten Tomatoes.

Releases
The film was released as a Region 2 DVD by Warner Home Video on 3 July 2006.
In America, the film was released as a Region 1 DVD by Warner Home Video on 21 September 2010.

Soundtrack
 Supergrass – "Alright"
 Pete Moore – "Asteroid"
 The Beloved – "Sweet Harmony"
 Stakka Bo – "Here We Go"
 The Monkees – "I'm a Believer"
 Stereo MC's – "Step It Up"
 Tom Jones – "If Only I Knew"
 Nouvelle Vague – "Just Can't Get Enough"
 Son of Dork – "We're Not Alone"

References

External links
 Alien Autopsy - The Full Original Footage on YouTube
 Alien Autopsy - Fact or Fiction? - Documentary on YouTube
 
 

2006 films
2006 LGBT-related films
Roswell incident in fiction
2000s science fiction comedy films
British science fiction comedy films
British LGBT-related films
LGBT-related science fiction comedy films
Films about filmmaking
Films set in 1995
Films set in 2005
Films set in London
Films set in Ohio
Films set in Miami
Films set in Los Angeles
Films set in Argentina
Films set in Venezuela
Films about hoaxes
Films with screenplays by William Davies
Films shot at Pinewood Studios
Qwerty Films films
2006 comedy films
2000s English-language films
2000s British films